Gift wrapping is the act of enclosing a gift in some sort of material. Wrapping paper is a kind of paper designed for gift wrapping. An alternative to gift wrapping is using a gift box or bag. A wrapped or boxed gift may be held closed with ribbon and topped with a decorative bow (an ornamental knot made of ribbon).

History

The use of wrapping paper is first documented in ancient China, where paper was invented in 2nd century BC. In the Southern Song dynasty, monetary gifts were wrapped with paper, forming an envelope known as a chih pao. The wrapped gifts were distributed by the Chinese court to government officials.  In the Chinese text Thien Kung Khai Wu, Sung Ying-Hsing states that the coarsest wrapping paper is manufactured with rice straws and bamboo fiber. 

Although the Hall brothers Rollie and Joyce Hall, founders of Hallmark Cards, did not invent gift wrapping, their innovations led to the development of modern gift wrapping. They helped to popularize the idea of decorative gift wrapping in the 20th century, and according to Joyce Hall, "the decorative gift-wrapping business was born the day Rollie placed those French envelope linings on top of that showcase."

By culture

Asian cultures 
In Chinese culture, red wrapping denotes luck because it is such a vibrant and strong color. It is seen as a symbol of happiness and good health. 

In Japanese culture, wrapping paper and boxes are common. However, the traditional cloth wrapping called furoshiki is increasing in popularity, particularly as an ecologically friendly alternative to wrapping paper.

In Korean culture, bojagi are sometimes used for gift wrapping. A yedanbo is a ceremonial gift bojagi used to wrap wedding gifts from the bride's family to the members of the groom's.

Western cultures
In Western culture, gifts are often wrapped in wrapping paper and accompanied by a gift note which may note the occasion, the receiver's name and the giver's name.

Prior to the introduction of tissue paper, Upper-class Victorians in the west commonly used decorated and coloured thick paper to cover their gifts. Modern patterned wrapping paper was introduced to the American market by the Hall Brothers in 1917.  The Kansas City stationery store had run out of traditional white, red, and green monocolor tissue papers, and started selling colorful envelope liners from France. Proving popular, the company promoted the new designs in the subsequent decades, adding ribbons in the 1930s, and Hallmark remains one of the largest American producers of gift wrap.  Hallmark records that gift wrap accounts for $3.2 billion annually in retail sales in the U.S.

Waste
In Britain, it is estimated that 226,800 miles of wrapping paper is thrown away annually at Christmas. In Canada, 6 million rolls of tape are used and discarded yearly for gift wrapping at Christmas. Some people attempt to avoid this by unwrapping gifts with care to hopefully allow the paper to be reused, while others use decorated cloth gift sacks that can be easily reused many times; both of these concepts are part of the green gifting trend that encourages recycling. Many people are moving into the trend of wrapping gifts with newspaper, magazine pages, old maps, calendars and into baskets to save single use wrapping paper from ending up in the garbage.

Psychology 
In the past, gift wrapping has been shown to positively influence the recipient who are more likely to rate their gifts positively if they had traditional gift wrapping. More recently, researchers have found that gift recipients will have higher expectations of the gift inside based on the neatness of the gift-wrapping.

In many countries the colour of wrapping paper has associations with symbolic meanings pertaining to funerals and mourning. These certain colours should be avoided when wrapping gifts in these countries.

References

External links

Giving
Packaging
Paper products
Domestic implements
Birthdays
Chinese inventions
American inventions
Holidays